The seaside sparrow (Ammospiza maritima) is a species of American sparrow.

Description
Adults have brownish upperparts with gray on the crown and nape, and a grayish-buff-colored breast with dark streaks; they have a dark face with gray cheeks, a white throat, and a short, pointed tail. Birds show a small yellow streak just above the eye. A typical seaside sparrow lifespan in 8 to 9 years of maximum. The oldest record of seaside sparrow was an individual male which at least 10 years old, at he recaptured, measure out the age and re-released during the banding operations of South Carolina.

Distribution and habitat
Their breeding habitat is salt marshes on the Atlantic and Gulf coasts of the United States from southern New Hampshire to southern Texas. The nest is an open cup usually built in the salt marsh on tidal reeds and spartina grasses. Females lay two to five eggs.

Breeding
Northern birds most often migrate farther south along the eastern coast of the United States. They forage on the ground or in marsh vegetation, sometimes probing in mud. They mainly eat insects, marine invertebrates and seeds. Their feeding areas are often some distance away from the areas they choose to nest.

Conservation
One of the numerous subspecies of this bird, the dusky seaside sparrow (A. m. nigrescens), has recently become extinct, and the Cape Sable subspecies, A. m. mirabilis, is endangered. Occurring in a restricted range but of uncertain validity is Scott's seaside sparrow, (A. m. peninsulae). The small isolated population that near Corpus Christi, Texas, south to the Rio Grande and sennetti subspecies may also have risk to endangered, those were formerly considered a separate species.

Call
The song is a raspy buzz that closely resembles a distant red-winged blackbird.

Subspecies 
Currently there are eight subspecies recognized:

 Ammospiza maritima fisheri (Chapman, 1899)
 Ammospiza maritima macgillivraii (Audubon, 1834)
 Ammospiza maritima maritima (A. Wilson, 1811) – Nominate subspecies
 Ammospiza maritima mirabilis (A. H. Howell, 1919) - Cape Sable seaside sparrow
 Ammospiza maritima nigrescens (Ridgway, 1874) - Dusky seaside sparrow †
 Ammospiza maritima pelonota (Oberholser, 1931)
 Ammospiza maritima peninsulae (J. A. Allen, 1888) - Scott's seaside sparrow
 Ammospiza maritima sennetti (J. A. Allen, 1888)

References

External links

 
Stamps (for the United States) with a range map at bird-stamps.org
 
 Dusky seaside sparrow bird sound at the Florida Museum of Natural History
 Cape Sable seaside sparrow bird sound at the Florida Museum of Natural History
 "Ecological and Genetic Diversity in the Seaside Sparrow" (pdf, 0.95 Mb)
 

seaside sparrow
Endemic birds of the Eastern United States
seaside sparrow
Taxa named by Alexander Wilson (ornithologist)